Gus-Khrustalny District is an administrative and municipal district (raion), one of the sixteen in Vladimir Oblast, Russia. It is located in the south of the oblast. Its administrative center is the town of Gus-Khrustalny (which is not administratively a part of the district). Population:   50,813 (2002 Census);

Administrative and municipal status
Within the framework of administrative divisions, Gus-Khrustalny District is one of the sixteen in the oblast. The town of Gus-Khrustalny serves as its administrative center, despite being incorporated separately as an administrative unit with the status equal to that of the districts.

As a municipal division, the district is incorporated as Gus-Khrustalny Municipal District. The Town of Gus-Khrustalny is incorporated separately from the district as Gus-Khrustalny Urban Okrug.

Economy and transportation
The Gusevskoye peat narrow gauge railway for hauling peat operates in the district.

References

Notes

Sources

Districts of Vladimir Oblast
 
